Aleksandr Gerasimov (19 March 1959 – 21 May 2020) was a Soviet ice hockey player. He won a gold medal at the 1984 Winter Olympics.

Career statistics

Regular season and playoffs

International

Death 
Gerasimov died on 21 May 2020.

References

External links

1959 births
2020 deaths
Ice hockey players at the 1984 Winter Olympics
Olympic gold medalists for the Soviet Union
Russian ice hockey players
Soviet ice hockey players
Olympic medalists in ice hockey
Medalists at the 1984 Winter Olympics
Sportspeople from Penza